Fieldingiidae is a family of sponges belonging to the order Sceptrulophora.

Genera:
 Fieldingia Kent, 1870

References

Sponges